SCB-27 (also known as "Two Seven-Alpha" or "Two Seven-Charlie") was the United States Navy designation for a series of upgrades to the s (both the short-hull and long-hull Ticonderoga versions), conducted between 1947 and 1955. These upgrades were intended to allow the World War II-era carriers to operate jet aircraft.

, laid up incomplete at the conclusion of World War II, served as the prototype and was re-ordered to the SCB-27 standard.

Modifications
The SCB-27 modernization was very extensive, requiring some two years for each carrier. Stronger and larger elevators, much more powerful catapults, and new Mk 5 arresting gear were installed. The original four twin 5-inch/38 gun mounts were removed, clearing the flight deck of guns. The new five-inch gun battery consisted of eight weapons, two on each quarter beside the flight deck. Twin 3-inch/50 gun mounts replaced the 40 mm guns, offering much greater effectiveness through the use of proximity fuzed ammunition. The reconstruction eliminated the difference between "short-hull" and "long-hull" ships; all now had similar clipper bows. New Mark 56 fire-control systems were also added to the ships.

The island was completely redesigned, made taller, but shorter in overall length with the removal of its gun mounts. In addition, the boiler uptakes were rebuilt and angled aft to accommodate a single radar and communications mast atop the island. To better protect aircrews, ready rooms were moved from the gallery deck to below the armored hangar deck, with a large escalator on the starboard side amidships to move flight crews up to the flight deck. Fire fighting capabilities were enhanced through the addition of two emergency fire and splinter bulkheads to the hangar deck, a fog/foam firefighting system, improved water curtains and a cupronickel fire main. Also improved were electrical generating power, and weapons stowage and handling facilities. All this added considerable weight: displacement increased by some twenty percent.

Modification sub-types

The two sub-types of SCB-27 modifications were primarily a result of changes in catapult technology in the early-1950s.  SCB-27A vessels used a pair of H 8 slotted-tube hydraulic catapults, while the later  SCB-27C vessels were fitted with a pair of C 11 steam catapults, a British innovation (in fact the first four installed, on Hancock and Ticonderoga, were British-built). To accommodate the catapult machinery, the SCB-27C vessels were slightly heavier (43,060 vice 40,600 tons) and after bulging wider abeam (103 vice 101 feet) than their SCB-27A sisters. Additionally, the SBC-27C carriers were equipped with jet blast deflectors, deck cooling, fuel blending facilities, emergency recovery barrier and storage and handling for nuclear weapons, which was not included in all of the SCB-27A carriers. Under SCB-27C the No. 3 (after) elevator was moved to the starboard deck edge; this elevator was located further aft on the first three SCB-27C ships than it was on the ships which received it concomitantly with an angled flight deck under the SCB-125 program.

The greater capacity of steam catapults meant that the 27C ships were able to serve as attack carriers through the Vietnam era while their hydraulic-equipped 27A sisters were relegated to antisubmarine duties.

Program history

References

Portions of this entry were drawn from the Naval Historical Center SCB-27 information and photos 

Cold War aircraft carriers of the United States
Korean War aircraft carriers of the United States
Essex-class aircraft carriers